Yakob Sayuri (born 22 September 1997) is an Indonesian professional footballer who plays as a winger for Liga 1 club PSM Makassar and the Indonesia national team. He is the twin brother of Yance Sayuri, who is also a footballer.

Club career

Early career
Coming from the remote island chain of Yapen in Papua province, Yakob had no experience training in any football academy or organized youth team. He started his professional career in 2017 in the third-tier of Indonesian football with Persewar Waropen after coach Eduard Ivakdalam, a former national team player, found Yakob casually playing in his hometown of Serui. Yakob followed Ivakdalam when the coach moved to Persemi Mimika in 2018.

Barito Putera
Yakob signed with Liga 1 club Barito Putera. In his breakout season, Yakob played 25 matches and scored twice.

PSM Makassar
Yakob signed with PSM Makassar in 2020. Yakob made his club debut on 1 February 2020 against PSS Sleman. 

On 26 February 2020, Yakob scored his first AFC Cup goal for PSM Makassar in the 53rd minute of a 3–1 win against Myanmar National League club Shan United, especially for the second goal that was scored by Yakob, this goal was not only successful in helping PSM win. However, it also made it into the AFC Goal of The Week nomination. Yakob only made 2 appearances in the Liga 1 and 3 appearances in the 2020 AFC Cup with PSM in the 2020 season due to the Covid-19 pandemic. Even so, Yakob impressed in PSM's international matches in the 2020 AFC Cup. This led to invitations to train for the Indonesia senior team under coach Shin Tae-yong.

On 18 September 2021, Yakob made his first league goal for the club in a 3–1 win over Persebaya Surabaya. He scored again in a 2–1 loss to Borneo Samarinda on 22 October and in a 2–1 win against PS Barito Putera on 28 January 2022. 

On 7 February, Yakob scored in injury time of second half against Bali United. On 29 August, he scored a brace in a 5–1 win over Persib Bandung. He scored again in 45th minute in a 3–0 win over Persebaya on 10 September.

On 30 January 2023, Yakob scored another brace in a 3–1 win against RANS Nusantara.

International career
Yakob made his international debut for the Indonesia under-23 side on 7 June 2019 against Thailands. He received a call-up to the senior Indonesia team in May 2021. He earned his first senior cap in a friendly against Afghanistan on 25 May.

Yakob scored his first international goal in injury time in Indonesia's 7–0 win over Brunei on 26 December 2022. He was chosen as man of the match in the return fixture against Brunei in the 2022 AFF Championship.

Career statistics

Club

International

International goals

References

External links
 Yakob Sayuri at Liga Indonesia
 

1997 births
Living people
Papuan people
Indonesian footballers
Persewar Waropen players
PS Barito Putera players
PSM Makassar players
Liga 1 (Indonesia) players
Indonesia youth international footballers
Indonesia international footballers
People from Yapen Islands Regency
Association football midfielders
Sportspeople from Papua
Indonesian twins
Twin sportspeople